Qareh Khawoserre was possibly the third king of the Canaanite 14th Dynasty of Egypt, who reigned over the eastern Nile Delta from Avaris during the Second Intermediate Period. His reign is believed to have lasted about 10 years, from 1770 BC until 1760 BC or later, around 1710 BC. Alternatively, Qareh could have been a later vassal of the Hyksos kings of the 15th Dynasty and would then be classified as a king of the 16th Dynasty.

Qareh's name is West Semitic and means "The bald one". Qareh's name was earlier misread as Qar, Qur, and Qal.

Attestations 
Qareh Khawoserre is attested by thirty royal seals inscribed with his name, only one of which has a known provenance: Jericho in Canaan. His nomen Qareh is attested by 8 seals and his prenomen Khawoserre is attested by 22 seals.

Identification 
The Egyptologist Kim Ryholt equates Qareh with the prenomen Khawoserre, which is also only attested through scarab seals. Qareh's chronological position is uncertain, with Ryholt and Darrell Baker placing him as the third king of the 14th Dynasty based on the style of his seals. On the other hand, Thomas Schneider and Jürgen von Beckerath see him as a ruler of the 16th Dynasty. Alternatively, James Peter Allen proposes that he was an Hyksos ruler of the early 15th Dynasty

See also 

 Hyksos

References

18th-century BC Pharaohs
Pharaohs of the Fourteenth Dynasty of Egypt
Pharaohs of the Sixteenth Dynasty of Egypt